People's Liberation Army of Turkey-Revolutionary Path of Turkey was a splinter group of the People's Liberation Army of Turkey (THKO). People's Liberation Army of Turkey-Revolutionary Path of Turkey appeared in 1975.

Notes

1975 establishments in Turkey
Communist organizations in Turkey
Defunct communist militant groups
Left-wing militant groups in Turkey
Military units and formations established in 1975
Organizations with year of disestablishment missing